The New Black is the fifth and final studio album by Canadian heavy metal band Strapping Young Lad. It was released on July 11, 2006, debuting at No. 200 on the Billboard charts. A music video was shot for the album's sole single, "Wrong Side", and another video, done in CGI, was made for the non-single song "Almost Again".

Background
Century Media imposed a strict deadline on the release date of the album: it was to be ready before the 2006 Ozzfest festival. Despite this, Townsend stated the recording was not rushed, and The New Black became a critical, as well as a commercial, success. It was more melodic than any of the band's previous albums and brought back the debut album's tongue-in-cheek humour.

"Decimator" references "Depth Charge" from Accelerated Evolution. "Far Beyond Metal" is a studio recording of a tour song previously released on No Sleep 'till Bedtime and For Those Aboot to Rock. "Almost Again" emulates the keyboard-heavy ending of "Truth" from Infinity. "Polyphony" shares a riff with "Judgement" from Synchestra. A riff from "Monument" was later used as the bridge riff of "Lucky Animals" on Epicloud. An instrumental version of "Fucker" was released on Contain Us.

Promotion and touring 
A music video was shot in late May to accompany the sole single from the album, "Wrong Side". In June 2006 Strapping Young Lad embarked on a short festival tour of Europe, including performances at the Rock am Ring and Rock im Park festivals in Germany, and the Download Festival in England, which was followed by a second stage appearance at Ozzfest in July and August, where they played to some of the largest audiences in their career.

Packaging 
The album comes packaged with a second CD featuring a sampling of various other Century Media artists. The European version contains two bonus tracks: "The Long Pig" and a cover of Melvins' "Zodiac". The Japanese version contains "The Long Pig" and the instrumental "C:enter:###".

Release
The New Black was released on July 11, 2006. Having sold more than 4,000 copies during its first week, The New Black reached No. 200 on the Billboard 200 chart, No. 15 on the Top Independent Albums, and No. 8 on the Top Heatseekers charts.

Critical reception 

Stylus Magazine's Cosmo Lee described the album as "heavy, catchy, and with no filler", and About.com's Chad Bowar was also positive giving the album four and a half stars out of five, stating that "this is a CD that's dense and heavy, but also has some memorable hooks".

Track listing

Personnel
Devin Townsend – vocals, guitar, production
Jed Simon – guitar, backing vocals
Gene Hoglan – drums, percussion
Byron Stroud – bass guitar, backing vocals
Will Campagna – keyboards, backing vocals
Cam Kroetsch (The Almighty Punchdrunk) – guest vocals on "You Suck"
Oderus Urungus (Gwar) – guest vocals on "Far Beyond Metal"
Bif Naked – guest vocals on "Fucker"
Chris Valagao (Zimmers Hole) – backing vocals
Shaun Thingvold – engineering
Mike Fraser – mixing
Ryan Van Poederooyen – drum technician
Travis Smith – artwork and photography

Charts

References

External links
The New Black at Century Media Records

2006 albums
Strapping Young Lad albums
Century Media Records albums
Albums produced by Devin Townsend